"Sailing to Byzantium" is a poem by William Butler Yeats, first published in the 1928 collection The Tower. It comprises four stanzas in ottava rima, each made up of eight lines of iambic pentameter. It uses a journey to Byzantium (Constantinople) as a metaphor for a spiritual journey. Yeats explores his thoughts and musings on how immortality, art, and the human spirit may converge. Through the use of various poetic techniques, Yeats's "Sailing to Byzantium" describes the metaphorical journey of a man pursuing his own vision of eternal life as well as his conception of paradise.

Synopsis
Written in 1926 (when Yeats was 60 or 61), "Sailing to Byzantium" is Yeats' definitive statement about the agony of old age and the imaginative and spiritual work required to remain a vital individual even when the heart is "fastened to a dying animal" (the body). Yeats's solution is to leave the country of the young and travel to Byzantium, where the sages in the city's famous gold mosaics could become the "singing-masters" of his soul. He hopes the sages will appear in fire and take him away from his body into an existence outside time, where, like a great work of art, he could exist in "the artifice of eternity." This is a reference to the legend that when the Turks entered the church (Hagia Sophia) in 1453, the priests who were singing the Divine Liturgy took up the sacred vessels and disappeared into the wall of the church, where they will stay and only come out when the church is returned to Christendom (see Timothy Gregory, A History of Byzantium, page 337). In the final stanza of the poem, he declares that once he is out of his body he will never again appear in the form of a natural thing; rather, he will become a golden bird, sitting on a golden tree, singing of the past ("what is past"), the present (that which is "passing"), and the future (that which is "to come").

The Golden Bough is a reference to the Aeneid, book VI, by the Roman poet Virgil (70–19 BC), where it is offered as a gift by Trojan hero Aeneas to Proserpina to enter the gate of the underworld. Aeneas' father Anchises describes the spirit inside every body

The seeds of life—

fiery is their force, divine their birth, but they

are weighed down by the bodies' ills or dulled

by earthly limbs and flesh that's born for death.

That is the source of all men's fears and longings,

joys and sorrows, nor can they see the heavens' light,

shut up in the body's tomb, a prison dark and deep.

(Aeneid VI:843-848) 

This describes the tension between physicality and spirituality, mortality and immortality, which are the themes of this poem.

Interpretation

Yeats wrote in a draft script for a 1931 BBC broadcast:

I am trying to write about the state of my soul, for it is right for an old man to make his soul, and some of my thoughts about that subject I have put into a poem called 'Sailing to Byzantium'. When Irishmen were illuminating the Book of Kells, and making the jeweled croziers in the National Museum, Byzantium was the centre of European civilization and the source of its spiritual philosophy, so I symbolize the search for the spiritual life by a journey to that city.

John Crowe Ransom comments: "The prayer is addressed to holy sages who dwell I know not where; it does not seem to matter where, for they seem qualified to receive the prayer, and it is a qualified and dignified prayer."

Epifanio San Juan writes that the action of the poem "occurs in the tension between memory and desire, knowledge and intuition, nature and history, subsumed within a vision of eternal order".

Cleanth Brooks asks whether, in this poem,  Yeats chooses idealism or materialism and answers his own question, "Yeats chooses both and neither. One cannot know the world of being save through the world of becoming (though one must remember that the world of becoming is a meaningless flux aside from the world of being which it implies)".

Influence
A second poem written by W. B. Yeats, "Byzantium", extends and complements "Sailing to Byzantium". It blends descriptions of the medieval city in nighttime darkness with spiritual, supernatural and artistic imagery.

The short story "No Country for Old Men" by Irish author Seán Ó Faoláin, about two veterans of the Irish War of Independence struggling to find their place in the Irish Republic of the 1950s, takes its title from the first line of the poem. His daughter, author Julia O'Faolain, added her own twist when she titled her Booker-nominated 1980 novel No Country for Young Men.

A science fiction novella by the same name by Robert Silverberg was published in 1985. The story, like the poem, deals with immortality and includes quotations from the poem.

Philip Roth's 2001 short novel The Dying Animal takes its title from the third stanza, and is explicitly referenced in the text.

Canadian author Guy Gavriel Kay's historical fantasy duology The Sarantine Mosaic was inspired by this poem.

A song on Lisa Gerrard and Patrick Cassidy's 2004 album Immortal Memory was named after the poem.

The title of the 2005 novel No Country for Old Men by Cormac McCarthy and the 2007 Oscar-winning film adapted from it, comes from the first line of this poem.

In the 2020 video game Cyberpunk 2077 by CD Projekt Red, the last verse of “Sailing to Byzantium” is recited by the A.I. Alt Cunningham during the “New Dawn Fades” ending.

Notes

References
 "Sailing to Byzantium" Poetry Foundation. 
 "Sailing to Byzantium" The Britannica Guide to the Nobel Prizes. 1997. 30 April 2006.

External links
Watch 'Sailing to Byzantium' master class video (National Library of Ireland)

1928 poems
Poetry by W. B. Yeats
Byzantine Empire in art and culture